Julie Ancis (born 1966) currently is a Distinguished Professor of Informatics at the New Jersey Institute of Technology. She served as the interim chair of the Department of Informatics and was also a Professor of Psychology and the inaugural Director of Cyberpsychology at the New Jersey Institute of Technology. She was previously a professor at Georgia State University for 15 years and Associate Vice President of Diversity at Georgia Institute of Technology. Ancis is an expert in the areas of cyberpsychology,  multicultural competence and diversity. She has authored 4 books and over 80 scholarly publications.

Ancis holds Fellow Status in the American Psychological Association (APA) in Division 17,  Division 35, and Division 46. She has presented both nationally and internationally at leading conferences such as the American Psychological Association Conference, the International Congress of Applied Psychology, the International Conference of Psychology, the American Psychological Society, and TTI/Vanguard. Ancis has served on professional committees and has held leadership positions within the American Psychological Association, the Georgia Psychological Association, and the American Counseling Association.

Education
Ancis completed her B.A. in psychology, M.S.in Counseling, and Ph.D. in Counseling Psychology from the University at Albany, State University of New York. She completed her doctoral internship at the University of Maryland in 1994.

Career 
Ancis began her academic career at Old Dominion University where she served as an assistant professor from 1994 to 1997. She then moved to Georgia State University where she was a tenured faculty member from 1994 to 2012 and earned Full Professor in 2008. In 2012, she joined the Georgia Institute of Technology as their inaugural vice president of Institute Diversity, Equity, and Inclusion where she initiated several programs that developed staff, faculty, and campus leadership on issues of equity and inclusion, such as implicit bias workshops.  She also developed and co-facilitated a women's leadership program at the Georgia Institute of Technology. In October 2019, Ancis joined the New Jersey Institute of Technology as professor of psychology and the inaugural Director of Cyberpsychology.She was promoted to the rank of Distinguished Professor in 2022.

Ancis has authored four books. She is known for her seminal work in cyberpsychology, white privilege, diversity, and the educational and legal experiences of women and girls. She has also written several publications examining the intersection of diversity and technology, including an overview of the field of cyberpsychology and the cyberpsychology blog for Psychology Today. Ancis is a Fellow of the American Psychological Association (Divisions 17, 35, and 46) and Past-Chair of the Society of Counseling Psychology's Section for the Advancement of Women. She is the Principal or Co-Principal Investigator of over 6 million dollars in grant funding from the Department of Education and the National Science Foundation.

Awards and honors 
 2021 Fellow, Society for Media Psychology and Technology, Division 46, American Psychological Association.
 2015 Fellow, Psychology of Women, Division 35, American Psychological Association. 
 2011 Fellow, Society of Counseling Psychology, Division 17, American Psychological Association.
 2010 Woman of the Year Award, American Psychological Association, Society of Counseling Psychology, Division 17, Section for the Advancement of Women. 
 2009-2009 Cambridge Who's Who, Listing.
 2005 Outstanding Faculty Research Award, College of Education, Georgia State University.

Selected publications

Books

Journals

References 

1966 births
Living people
Georgia Tech faculty
University at Albany, SUNY alumni
Fellows of the American Psychological Association
American women psychologists
21st-century American psychologists
American women academics
21st-century American women
20th-century American psychologists